Ruoqiang County as the official romanized name, also transliterated from Uyghur as Qakilik County, is a county in the Xinjiang Uyghur Autonomous Region, China under the administration of the Bayingolin Mongol Autonomous Prefecture.

The county seat is in Ruoqiang Town. This is the location which less-detailed maps will label as "Ruoqiang".

History
The ancient settlement of Charklik was located in what is today Ruoqiang County.

The Charkhlik Revolt took place here in 1935 when Uyghurs revolted against the Hui-dominated Tunganistan, which was controlled by the 36th Division (National Revolutionary Army). The Uyghurs were defeated.

In 1959, the less-offensive written form of "若羌" ("like the Qiang") was adopted. The Uyghur name of the county, "Çakilik", is transliterated in Chinese as "" (Qiǎkèlǐkè).

On July 24, 2015, Tieganlike was changed from a township to a town.

Geography
Ruoqiang County ranges in latitude from 36° 00' to 41° 23' N and in longitude from 86° 45 to 93° 45' E. It borders Qiemo County to the west, Yuli County, Piqan County, and Kumul to the north, the provinces of Gansu and Qinghai to the east, and the Tibet Autonomous Region to the south.

The populated areas are located mostly along the northern foothills of the Altyn-Tagh mountain range. North of this strip of irrigated agricultural settlement is the Taklamakan Desert, south, the Altyn-Tagh and Kunlun Mountains.

The well known Lop Lake, these days usually dry, is located in the northeastern part of the county - the section officially known as Luobu Po Town, i.e., Lop Lake Town.

The southern part of the county (administratively, Qimantag Township), is mountainous. The highest point in Qinghai, Bukadaban Feng, is located on the border of Qinghai and Ruoqiang County. The high plateau between the Altyn-Tagh and the main Kunlun range (which includes the Ulugh Muztagh) is known as the Kumkol Basin: an endorheic basin, where several saline lakes are found. Part of Altun Shan National Nature Reserve is located in Qimantag Township, in southern Ruoqiang County.

These lakes are among the few noticeable bodies of water in this extremely arid area; the area around them is officially protected as the Altun Shan Nature Reserve.

Climate
Ruoqiang has a cold desert climate (Köppen climate classification BWk) with extreme seasonal variation in temperature. Precipitation totals only  annually, and mostly falls in summer. With monthly percent possible sunshine ranging from 63% in March to 82% in October, the area receives close to 3,100 hours of bright sunshine annually.

Administrative divisions

The county is made up of five towns, three townships and other areas:

Towns (镇)
 Ruoqiang Town ( / چاقىلىق بازىرى)
 Yitunbulake (Yetimbulak, Qilanbulak;  / يېتىمبۇلاق بازىرى)
 Lopnur Town ( / لوپنۇر كۆلى بازىرى)
 Tieganlike (formerly  / تىكەنلىك بازىرى)

Townships (乡)
  (Wu-t'a-mu;  / ئۇتام يېزىسى)
  (Tomorlog, Tiemulike;  / تۆمۈرۈاك يېزىسى)
  (Qimantage, Ch'i-man-t'a-ko;  /  / )

Others
 36th regiment field of the Second Agricultural Division of the Xinjiang Production and Construction Corps (兵团36团场 / 36-تۇەن مەيدانى).

Economy
, there was about 2,740 acres (18,113 mu) of cultivated land in Qakilik.

Demographics
As of 2015, 18,983 (55.8%) of the 34,020 residents of the county were Han Chinese, 13,328 (39.2%) were Uyghur and 1,709 were from other ethnic groups.

, the county had a population of 31,877, of which 18,957 (59.5%) were of Han ethnicity, while Uyghurs numbered 11,761 (36.9%).

As of 1999, 58.72% of the population of the county was Han Chinese and 38.2% of the population was Uyghur.

As of 1997, several township-level divisions had a majority or plurality of Uyghur residents including Wutamu Township (62.3%), Tieganlike Township (61.3%), Ruoqiang Town (57.9%), and Waxxari (Washixia) Township (43.9%).

Transportation
China National Highway 218
China National Highway 315
Ruoqiang Loulan Airport
Golmud-Korla Railway

Plans also exist for the construction of the Hotan-Ruoqiang Railway.

The following expressways are under construction in the county:

 G0612 Expressway connecting the county to Hotan and Kashgar to the West, and Golmud in Qinghai to the East
 G0711 Expressway connecting the county to Korla and Ürümqi to the North

See also
 Lop Nur

Notes

References

External links

 A Tourism Guide to "Charklik / Ruoqiang - Ancient Kingdom and Outpost Gateway"

County-level divisions of Xinjiang
Populated places along the Silk Road
Bayingolin Mongol Autonomous Prefecture